Onur Çukur (born 9 August 1999) is a Turkish volleyball player for Galatasaray and the Turkish national team. He studied and played for 4 years at Grand Canyon University where he obtained a degree in psychology.

Club career
On 13 August 2021, Galatasaray HDI Sigorta signed a one-year contract with young setter Çukur.

References

External links
Player profile at Volleybox.net

1999 births
Living people
Turkish men's volleyball players
Galatasaray S.K. (men's volleyball) players
Arkas Spor volleyball players